David Grossman (born 1954) is an Israeli writer.

David Grossman may also refer to:
 Dave Grossman (author) (born 1956), author who has specialized in the study of the psychology of killing
 Dave Grossman (game developer), game programmer and game designer
 David Grossman (director), American film and television director
 David Grossman (journalist), British journalist
 David C. Grossman, American pediatrician
 Dovid Grossman (scholar) (1946–2018), rabbi and Talmudic scholar

See also
Yitzchak Dovid Grossman (born 1946), rabbi
David Grosman (born 1974), French bassist and former touring member of Queen.